The Hugo Awards are presented every year by the World Science Fiction Society for the best science fiction or fantasy works and achievements of the previous year. The award is named after Hugo Gernsback, the founder of the pioneering science fiction magazine Amazing Stories, and was once officially known as the Science Fiction Achievement Award. The award has been described as "a fine showcase for speculative fiction" and "the best known literary award for science fiction writing". In addition to the regular awards that have been given in most years that the awards have been active, several discontinued Hugo Awards have been presented throughout the years, only to be removed after a few years.

When the Hugo awards were begun in 1953, each Worldcon organizing committee decided what awards they would give. Several awards were presented over the next few years which were not repeated in later conventions, unlike the primary categories which are still presented—such as Best Novel. These awards were the Best Cover Artist, Best Interior Illustrator, Excellence in Fact Articles, Best New SF Author or Artist, and #1 Fan Personality Hugos at the initial 1953 awards ceremony, the Best Feature Writer, Best Book Reviewer, and Most Promising New Author awards in 1956, the Outstanding Actifan award in 1958, and the Best New Author of 1958 award in 1959.

In 1961, however, formal rules were set down for which categories would be awarded, which could only be changed by the World Science Fiction Society membership through the annual Business Meeting. Despite this, the 1964 convention awarded a Hugo Award for the Best SF Book Publisher, which was not on that list. Immediately afterward the guidelines were changed to allow individual conventions to create additional categories, which was codified as up to two categories for that year. These additional awards were officially designated as Hugo Awards, but were not required to be repeated by future conventions. This was later adjusted to only allow one additional category. The Best SF Book Publisher award was repeated in 1965, and the Best All-Time Series award was given in 1966. No other additional categories were added by 1974, when the guidelines were changed again to allow up to ten categories which would be chosen by each convention, though they were expected to be similar to those presented in the year before. Despite this change no new awards were added or previous awards removed before the guidelines were changed back to listing specific categories. 

The next discontinued Hugo award was the Other Forms award, given in 1988. It was followed in 1990 by the Best Original Art Work award, which was listed again as a special award in 1991, though not actually awarded, and instated afterward as an official Hugo Award. It was then removed from this status in 1996, and has not been awarded since. The Best Web Site special Hugo award was given in 2002 and 2005, and was followed by the Best Series special award, given in 2017 in advance of it being ratified as a standard category for the following year, the Best Art Book award, given in 2019, and the Best Video Game award, given in 2021.

Hugo Award nominees and winners are chosen by supporting or attending members of the annual World Science Fiction Convention, or Worldcon, and the presentation evening constitutes its central event. The selection process is defined in the World Science Fiction Society Constitution as instant-runoff voting with five nominees, except in the case of a tie. These five works on the ballot are those most-nominated by members that year, with no limit on the number of works that can be nominated. The 1953 and 1958 awards did not include any recognition of runner-up nominees, but since 1959 all five candidates have been recorded. Initial nominations are made by members in January through March, while voting on the ballot of five nominations is performed roughly in April through July, subject to change depending on when that year's Worldcon is held. Worldcons are generally held near Labor Day, and in a different city around the world each year. Members are permitted to vote "no award", if they feel that none of the nominees is deserving of the award that year, and in the case that "no award" takes the majority the Hugo is not given in that category. The only time this has happened in the discontinued awards was in the 1959 Best New Author category.

Winners and nominees 
  *   Winners and joint winners
  +   No winner selected

Best Cover Artist

Best Interior Illustrator

Excellence in Fact Articles

Best New SF Author or Artist

#1 Fan Personality

Sometimes referred to as the "BNF Award". According to an interim report issued by the Philcon II convention committee while voting was still going on, the next most popular candidate to Ackerman at the time was Harlan Ellison. When Ackerman was handed the trophy at Philcon II (by Isaac Asimov), he actually physically declined, saying it should go to Ken Slater, to whom the trophy was later forwarded by the con committee.

Best Feature Writer

Best Book Reviewer

Most Promising New Author

Outstanding Actifan

Best New Author

Best SF Book Publisher

Best All-Time Series

Other Forms

Best Original Art Work

Best Web Site

Best Art Book

Best Video Game

References

External links
The Hugo Awards official website

Discontinued Hugo Awards
Hugo Awards